Jake Silverberg (born May 18, 1996) is an American professional racing cyclist. He rode in the men's team time trial at the 2015 UCI Road World Championships.

Major results
2014
 3rd Time trial, National Junior Road Championships

References

External links

1996 births
Living people
American male cyclists
Sportspeople from Pembroke Pines, Florida
Cyclists from Florida
20th-century American people
21st-century American people